Gerardus Kaanen (22 August 1892 – 4 May 1970) was a Belgian fencer. He competed in the team sabre event at the 1928 Summer Olympics.

References

External links
 

1892 births
1970 deaths
Belgian male sabre fencers
Olympic fencers of Belgium
Fencers at the 1928 Summer Olympics